Southwest Miramichi-Bay du Vin is a provincial electoral district for the Legislative Assembly of New Brunswick, Canada. It was created as Southwest Miramichi in 1973, by which name it was known until 2014, and was largely unchanged in the 1994 and 2006 redistributions.  In the 2013 redistribution, it moved eastward absorbing those parts of the former district of Miramichi-Bay du Vin which were outside the city of Miramichi.

Members of the Legislative Assembly

Election results

Southwest Miramichi-Bay du Vin

Southwest Miramichi

References

External links 
Website of the Legislative Assembly of New Brunswick

New Brunswick provincial electoral districts